Karl-Heinz Köpcke (29 September 1922 – 27 September 1991) was a German television presenter and newsreader.

Life 
Köpcke wanted to make a commercial training in his hometown of Hamburg, when he was drafted in 1941 to the Reichsarbeitsdienst. As a member of the Luftwaffe, Köpcke was captured by the French in 1945; he was freed in 1946.

He first went to Radio Bremen, before going to Hamburg in 1949 to take up a position as a radio announcer for the NWDR channel. His long-term presence on the screen – he was a newsreader on the Tagesschau bulletins from 2 March 1959 to 10 September 1987 – earned him the nickname  Mr. Tagesschau . He was the chief newsreader from 1964.

In 1978, the Tagesthemen news analysis programme was introduced, in which the newsreader played a background role to the main presenter. During the first broadcast, Köpcke protested by demonstratively shuffling his papers and by coughing.

In German-speaking countries, he set standards for the appearance and operation of newscasters. He died four years after his retirement at the age of 68 years from cancer just two days short to his 69th birthday, shortly after the death of his wife, broadcasting colleague Gertie Kelkenberg. They married in 1948.

His grave is located in Hamburg at the Cemetery Ohlsdorf.

Literature

References

External links 
 tagesschau.de
 Information about Karl-Heinz Köpcke

German television presenters
German male journalists
German television journalists
German broadcast news analysts
20th-century German journalists
1922 births
1991 deaths
German male writers
Deaths from cancer in Germany
Burials at the Ohlsdorf Cemetery
People from Hamburg
ARD (broadcaster) people
Norddeutscher Rundfunk people
Luftwaffe personnel of World War II
German prisoners of war in World War II held by France
Reich Labour Service members